John Warwick (1746–24 June 1828) was an English-born farmer and political figure in Nova Scotia. He represented Digby Township from 1806 to 1820 in the Nova Scotia House of Assembly.

He was born in Yorkshire and came to Virginia in 1774. Warwick took up arms in the loyalist cause and came to Digby, Nova Scotia at the end of the American Revolution. In 1800, he was named deputy postmaster.

References 
 Calnek, W. A. History of the County of Annapolis, Nova Scotia : Including Old Port Royal & Acadia (1999)

1746 births
1828 deaths
Nova Scotia pre-Confederation MLAs